Crania is an extinct genus of brachiopods that lived during the Upper Cretaceous.

Description 
The dorsal valve is smooth or has slight pustules. The ventral valve is only attached posteriorly and has a thickened flat grainy rim.

Reassigned species 
As the genus Crania was erected early on in paleontology, many species have since be reassigned.

See also 
 List of brachiopod genera
 Taxonomy of commonly fossilised invertebrates

References

 Illustrations conchyliologiques ou description et figures de toutes les coquilles connues vivantes et fossiles, classées suivant le système de Lamarck modifié d'après les progrès de la science et comprenant les genres nouveaux et les espèces rècemment découvertes. Tome2 (1842). Jean-Charles Chenu, 1842

Prehistoric brachiopod genera
Campanian genus first appearances
Maastrichtian genus extinctions
Craniata
Brachiopods of Asia
Paleozoic life of New Brunswick
Paleozoic life of Quebec
Paleozoic life of Yukon